The Battle of Bloody Creek was fought on 10/21 June 1711 during Queen Anne's War.  An Abenaki militia successfully ambushed British soldiers at a place that became known as Bloody Creek after the battles fought there.  The creek empties into the Annapolis River at present day Carleton Corner, Nova Scotia, and was also the location of a battle in 1757.

The battle was part of an orchestrated attempt by the leaders of New France to weaken the British hold on Annapolis Royal.  The British had only captured the fort the previous year and they only had a very tenuous control of the area.  The battle, in which the entire British force was captured or killed, emboldened the French and their native allies to blockade Annapolis Royal.  Without heavy weapons, the force was unable to effectively attack the fort, and abandoned the siege when British reinforcements arrived by sea.

Background
Port Royal, the capital of the French colony of Acadia, was settled in 1604, one year after Acadia's founding, and served as the colonial capital for much of the next hundred years.  It consequently became a focal point for conflict between the English colonists of New England and the Acadian inhabitants.  It was destroyed in 1613 by English raiders led by Samuel Argall, but eventually rebuilt.  In 1690 it was captured by forces from the Province of Massachusetts Bay, although it was restored to France on 20 September 1697 by the Treaty of Ryswick.

In the 1710 Siege of Port Royal an expedition of New England militia and British marines under Francis Nicholson again captured Port Royal. The town was renamed Annapolis Royal, with Samuel Vetch as the British Governor of Nova Scotia, and the fort was renamed Fort Anne.  This expedition left a garrison numbering about 450 men, that was composed of a combination of British marines and New England provincial militia.  The garrison was reinforced with regular troops in the following months, however the British only had effective control of the fort and the nearby town.  The terms of capitulation had included a provision in which the French residents within  of the fort were to be protected, provided they took an appropriate oath to the British crown. A total of 481 Acadians were covered by this provision, but by mid-January 1711 only 57 had actually taken an oath.

When word of Port Royal's fall reached France, the marine minister Pontchartrain ordered Antoine Gaulin, the French Catholic missionary priest to the loosely allied First Nation tribes of present-day Maine and New Brunswick, to harass the British at Annapolis Royal so that they could not establish a firm foothold in the territory.  Bernard-Anselme d'Abbadie de Saint-Castin, the métis Acadian (French father and a Penobscot mother), was given military command of Acadia, and received similar orders.

Prelude
The first winter was a particularly difficult one for the British garrison, which was reduced by early 1711 to about 240 "effective men Officers included" due to death, disease, and desertion. They had ongoing difficulty getting provisions and materials needed to repair the fort because of the reluctance of the Acadians to help.  This reluctance was fueled in part by the activities of Saint-Castin and Gaulin — the Acadians in Annapolis Royal refused to do the necessary logging, citing the danger of Native attacks.  To counter this, the British began sending out armed parties to protect the loggers. These logging parties were sent into the woodlands up the Annapolis River, and the cut wood was floated down the river.  In May 1711 Governor Vetch received reports that these work crews and others who supported the British were being harassed by Mi'kmaq and Abenakis opposed to British rule.  In his reports he noted that the fort was "every day more and more Infested with skulking Indians", and that villagers within the banlieu (the three-mile protection area) were being harassed. Desperate for timbers to repair the fort, Vetch organized a force of 70 New England militia under Captain David Pigeon to accompany the fort's engineer on an expedition up the river.  Pigeon's instructions were to assure the loggers that they would be paid and protected if they brought the timber down to the fort, but that there would be "severity" if they did not.

Not long before Pigeon's party set out, a Native force organized by Gaulin and Saint-Castin arrived in the area north of Annapolis Royal, with instructions to harass and ambush the British when the opportunity presented itself.  The exact size and composition of this force is not known with precision.  Vetch reported it to be 150, but other sources reported it to be as low as 50 men.  Many historians report that the force was composed of Abenakis, although Geoffrey Plank and others claim that the force also included some Mi'kmaq.  British Lieutenant Paul Mascarene for a time thought that some local Acadians might have been involved, but thought this unlikely after learning of its recent arrival (literally the day before, according to one account) in the area. The identity and ethnicity of its leader is also uncertain; Governor Vaudreuil reported that it was led by someone named l'Aymalle.

Battle
The New Englanders departed Annapolis Royal on 10/21 June in a whaleboat and two flatboats, heading up the Annapolis River.  Because they were delayed by the tide, word of the force's departure preceded them, giving the Natives time to set up an ambush near the mouth of what later became known as Bloody Creek.  The whaleboat was faster on the water, and was about a mile (1.6 km) ahead of the flatboats when it reached the ambush site.  The surprise was complete: all but one of the whaleboat's men were killed.  Hearing the gunfire, the flatboats hurried to catch up, and carelessly made directly for the whaleboat.  This exposed them to fire from Natives on the shore, and they suffered further significant casualties before they were surrounded and the survivors surrendered.  Sixteen were killed, nine wounded, and the rest were captured.

Aftermath

The victory at Bloody Creek rallied the local resistance, and prompted many of the Acadians who were nominally under British protection to withdraw to the north. Soon thereafter a force of some 600 warriors, including Acadians, Abenaki, and Mi'kmaq, gathered and blockaded Fort Anne under the leadership of Gaulin and Saint-Castin.  The defending garrison was small, but the attackers had no artillery and were thus unable to make an impression on the fort, and the fort was still accessible by sea. Gaulin went to Plaisance in Newfoundland for supplies and equipment to advance the siege; Governor Philippe Pastour de Costebelle provided supplies, but the ship had the misfortune to encounter a major British fleet and was captured. That same expedition abandoned its goal of attacking Quebec when eight of its ships were lost on the shores of the Saint Lawrence River; Governor Vetch, who had accompanied the expedition as a leader of the provincial militia, returned to Annapolis Royal with 200 provincial militia, after which the besiegers withdrew.

Annapolis Royal remained in British hands for the remainder of the war, but Acadians and Natives continued to resist the British after peace was reached and Acadia was formally ceded to Britain with the Treaty of Utrecht in 1713.  This resistance was motivated by a French desire to recover Acadia and by the concerns of the Abenaki and Mi'kmaq, who had not been parties to Utrecht, to British encroachment on their lands and liberties after the war ended. The Natives disputes led to Dummer's War in the 1720s; it was fought primarily in northern New England, but British settlements in Nova Scotia were also attacked.  The disputes between the French and British over Acadia/Nova Scotia were not resolved until the British conquests of the Seven Years' War and the expulsion of the Acadians in the 1750s.  The site was again the scene of battle during the Seven Years' War, and has been designated by the Canadian government as a National Historic Site.

See also 
 Military history of Nova Scotia

Endnotes

References

 

Story of Bloody Creek. Stories of the land of Evangeline by Rogers, Grace McLeod, 1891

External links
Parks Canada
Monument to the Battle of Bloody Creek (1711)

Bloody Creek 1711
Bloody Creek 1711
Bloody Creek 1711
Bloody Creek 1711
Annapolis County, Nova Scotia
Acadian history
Bloody Creek 1711
Bloody Creek 1711
1711 in Canada
Bloody Creek 1711
Bloody Creek 1711
Bloody Creek
Bloody Creek 1711
Bloody Creek 1711
Bloody Creek 1711